The Indianapolis version of the NWA World Tag Team Championship, which was actively used between 1951 and 1960, was a professional wrestling championship exclusively for two-man tag teams. As a member of the National Wrestling Alliance (NWA), the NWA Indianapolis territory was entitled to create an NWA World Tag Team Championship that they could promote within the boundaries of their territory, in this case Indiana, making it a "regional" championship despite being labeled a "world championship". Because the use of the championship was not restricted to one overall championship, a large number of different, regional championships bore the name "NWA World Tag Team Championship" between 1949 and 1992. In 1957 as many as 13 different versions were promoted across the United States. As it is a professional wrestling championship, it is not won or lost competitively but instead by the decision of the bookers of a wrestling promotion. The title is awarded after the chosen team "wins" a match to maintain the illusion that professional wrestling is a competitive sport.

The Indianapolis NWA World Tag Team Championship was introduced in 1951 as promoters Jim Barnett, Fred Kohler, Dick Patton, and Balk Estes decided to bring Ben and Mike Sharpe in from the West Coast to be their first champions. While the Sharpe brothers were being promoted as having won a tournament, no records of such a tournament has been found, making it likely they were simply announced as champions when they arrived in Indianapolis. In late 1951 the team of Rudy Kay and Al Williams, who worked for NWA Indianapolis on a regular basis, defeated the Sharpe brothers to cement the championship lineage in Indianapolis, while the Sharpe brothers returned to the West Coast. The team of Boris and Nicoli Volkoff won the championship on three occasions, setting a record for both teams and individuals. Reggie Lisowski and Stan Lisowski's first reign as champions lasted at least 243 days, the longest of any individual reign, and their two combined reigns totaled at least 342 days, as least 150 days longer than the second-longest combined reigns. Due to the fact that no dates were captured as part of the championship documentation, it is impossible to determine which team had the shortest reign.

Title history
Key

Team reigns by combined length
Key

Individual reigns by combined length
Key

Footnotes

Concurrent championships
Sources for 13 simultaneous NWA World Tag Team Championships
NWA World Tag Team Championship (Los Angeles version)
NWA World Tag Team Championship (San Francisco version)
NWA World Tag Team Championship (Central States version)
NWA World Tag Team Championship (Chicago version)
NWA World Tag Team Championship (Buffalo Athletic Club version)
NWA World Tag Team Championship (Georgia version)
NWA World Tag Team Championship (Iowa/Nebraska version)
NWA World Tag Team Championship (Indianapolis version)
NWA World Tag Team Championship (Salt Lake Wrestling Club version)
NWA World Tag Team Championship (Amarillo version)
NWA World Tag Team Championship (Minneapolis version)
NWA World Tag Team Championship (Texas version)
NWA World Tag Team Championship (Mid-America version)

References

National Wrestling Alliance championships
Tag team wrestling championships
Professional wrestling in Indiana
World professional wrestling championships
Sports competitions in Indianapolis